The Saudi Women's Premier League is the top flight of women's association football in Saudi Arabia. The competition is run by the  Saudi Arabian Football Federation.

History

The first Saudi women's club were King's United based in Jeddah, and Eastern Flames in Dhahran. Both were formed in 2006. Other women's teams were formed after in Riyadh and Dammam. In 2008, the first Saudi women's tournament was held with the participation of seven teams. In December 2019, the Jeddah Women's Football League was held, which was the first women competition organized by the Saudi Arabian Football Federation; it was won by Jeddah Eagles.

In February 2020, Saudi Arabia decided to launch a football league for women in the whole country. On 17 November 2020, the national league with 24 teams was launched; it was divided into three regions, Jeddah, Riyadh and Dammam which represent the Women's Community Football League, and the four best teams qualified to the WFL Champions Cup. Challenge Sports Club won the first edition.

Champions
The list of champions and runners-up:

Most successful clubs

Clubs

 Al-Ahli (formerly Mrass) 
 Al-Hilal (formerly Challenge)
 Al-Ittihad (formerly Jeddah Eagles)
 Al-Nassr  (formerly Al Mamlaka)
 Al-Shabab (formerly Storm)
 Al-Yamamah FC
 Eastern Flames FC
 Sama FC

References

External links 
 Saudi WFL official website
 New era for Saudi Arabia women's football – fifa.com

 
Saudi Arabia
Football competitions in Saudi Arabia
Women
2020 establishments in Saudi Arabia
Sports leagues established in 2020